The 1st Alberta Legislative Assembly was in session from November 9, 1905, to Monday, March 22, 1909, with the membership of the assembly determined by the results of the 1905 Alberta general election which was held on November 9, 1905. The Legislature officially began on November 9, 1905, and continued until the fourth session was prorogued on February 25, 1909, and dissolved the next day on February 26, 1909, prior to the 1909 Alberta general election.

Alberta's first government was controlled by the majority Liberal Party led by Premier Alexander Rutherford. The Official Opposition was the Conservative Party led by Albert John Robertson. The Speaker was Charles W. Fisher who served in the role until his death from the 1918 flu pandemic in 1919 partway through the 4th Alberta Legislature.

History of the First Legislature

The 1st Alberta Legislative Assembly came about after Alberta entered Confederation with the Alberta Act. The assembly met for the first time in 1906 under a strong Alberta Liberal Party majority. Construction of the Alberta Legislature Building would not begin until 1907, so the assembly would meet in the newly completed McKay Avenue School for the first two sessions of the First Legislative Assembly of Alberta in 1906 and 1907. Important bills passed in those sessions include confirming Edmonton as the provincial capital, the founding of the University of Alberta, establishment of provincial courts, and the provision of charters for several railway companies.

Edmonton was designated as the temporary capital city for Alberta during its creation. One of the major debates that occurred in this assembly was the capital city debate. A number of alternative capital cities were chosen and voted on. In the end partly due to the strong representation around Edmonton and strong Liberal majority, Edmonton was chosen as the permanent capital city in Alberta.

Labor MLA Donald McNabb's by-election victory made him the first third party candidate elected to the legislature and helped raise the strength of the labour movement in the Lethbridge area that would have an effect in Alberta politics for quite some time to come.

Telephone policy
Liberal government would make a number of large-scale forays into government operation of utilities, the most notable of which being the creation of Alberta Government Telephones. In 1906, Alberta's municipalities legislation was passed and included a provision authorizing municipalities to operate telephone companies. Several, including Edmonton, did so, alongside private companies. The largest private company was the Bell Telephone Company, which held a monopoly over service in Calgary. Such monopolies and the private firms' refusal to extend their services into sparsely-populated and unprofitable rural areas aroused demand for provincial entry into the market, which was effected in 1907. The government constructed a number of lines, beginning with one between Calgary and Banff, and it also purchased Bell's lines for $675,000.

Alberta's public telephone system was financed by debt, which was unusual for a government like Rutherford's, which.was generally committed to the principle of "pay as you go". Rutherford's stated rationale was that the cost of such a large capital project should not.be borne by a single generation and that incurring debt to finance a corresponding asset was, in contrast to operating deficits, acceptable. Though the move was popular at the time, it would prove not to be financially astute. By focusing on areas neglected by existing companies, the government was entering into the most expensive and least profitable fields of telecommunication. Such.problems would not come to fruition until Rutherford had left office, however. In the short term, the government's involvement in the telephone business helped it to a sweeping victory in the 1909 election. The Liberals won 37 of 41 seats in the newly-expanded legislature.

Labour bills
Rutherford's government legislated an eight-hour day, as well, Rutherford's government also passed workers' compensation legislation designed to make such compensation automatic, rather than requiring the injured worker to sue his employer. It also viewed the maximum payout of $1,500 as inadequate. In response to farmers' concerns, farm labourers were made exempt from the bill entirely.

Party composition

Members of the Legislative Assembly elected
For complete electoral history, see individual districts

Member changes after the election

References

Works cited

Further reading

External links
Alberta Legislative Assembly
Journals of the 1st Alberta Legislative Assembly
Legislative Assembly of Alberta Members Book
By-elections 1905 to present

01